Evan Seinfeld is an American musician and actor, as well as a director, photographer, writer, and former pornographic actor.  He is best known as the lead vocalist, bassist, and founding member of the hardcore/metal band Biohazard. Since leaving the band in May 2011 for personal reasons, he has joined the band Attika7 as a vocalist. He is the founder and CEO of subscription service IsMyGirl.

Career

Music 
Seinfeld was the founder, bassist and vocalist for the New York hardcore/heavy metal band Biohazard. Seinfeld founded the band in 1987 but left the band in early 2011. Evan was also the bassist for the short-lived supergroup Damnocracy, featured in the VH1 reality television show Supergroup, with other members including Ted Nugent, Sebastian Bach, Scott Ian and Jason Bonham. In March 2007, Evan Seinfeld debuted his new band, The Spyderz, as an opening act for a Buckcherry performance. The band was originally named White Line Fever until it was discovered that a UK band already owned the name. The Spyderz also featured guitarist John Monte, formerly of Ministry, M.O.D. and The Disparrows vocalist Daniel Weber. In October 2008, Seinfeld briefly joined Tattooed Millionaires as a bassist and co-vocalist.

In 2011 Seinfeld joined Attika7, a band featuring former members of Walls of Jericho, Static-X, Soulfly, and Possessed. The band's debut album, Blood of My Enemies, was released on July 31, 2012.

On July 25, 2019, Seinfeld debuted the first single from his newest musical project, SVG$, via YouTube. The song is titled "Authentic" and is Seinfeld's debut as a hip-hop artist.

Acting
Seinfeld portrayed Jaz Hoyt in the HBO prison drama Oz for a total of 40 episodes, spanning the majority of the series' six-year run. His character was the leader of the prison's biker gang and an ally of the Aryan Brotherhood, a white supremacist gang. He showed his full frontal nudity in some scenes of the series. In certain episodes of season 6, the Star of David tattoo on Seinfeld's stomach can be clearly seen.

Seinfeld, who was married to pornographic actress star Tera Patrick, has performed with her in seven films under the stage name "Spyder Jonez", including Reign of Tera, Teradise Island (which he also directed), Tera, Tera, Tera, and Desperate. In the final scene of Reign of Tera, he performs as the sole male in an orgy featuring ten Asian porn stars. He also performs in duo scenes with women other than Tera Patrick. Seinfeld continues to work in adult entertainment as Spyder Jonez, most notably through his production company, Iron Cross Entertainment and Teravison, the production company he co-owns with Tera Patrick, as well as his own "Rockstar Pornstar" website.

Seinfeld and Patrick appear in a number of celebrity TV series such as E! True Hollywood Story "Rockstar Wives", G4TV's A Day in the Life of Tera Patrick, VH1's Greatest Metal Songs, and WE's Secret Lives of Women.

Seinfeld appeared in the independent films Angry Dogs, Kiss Me Now, and Wizard of Gore. Both he and Patrick appeared in the documentary Fuck.

Seinfeld has voice acted in several Rockstar Games, voicing a Skin in Manhunt, the Honkers bouncer in Grand Theft Auto IV, and several gangsters in The Warriors, including Hog, Nails, Kevin K, and Fleece.

Other appearances

He is one of the characters in the book Sex Tips from Rock Stars by Paul Miles, published in July 2010 from Omnibus Press.

On November 21, 2011, he appeared on The Real Housewives of Beverly Hills performing in Ace Young's band for Taylor Armstrong's daughter's fifth birthday party.

In 2022, Seinfeld appeared as himself in Sell/Buy/Date directed by Sarah Jones.

Awards
2008 XBIZ Award – Crossover Male Star of the Year
2009 XBIZ Award – ASACP Service Recognition Award

Personal life
After a three-year relationship, Seinfeld married Tera Patrick in a small ceremony on January 9, 2004. The ceremony was held in Las Vegas where they were attending the 2004 AVN Awards show. The couple announced on September 30, 2009 that they were ending their marriage, but that they would remain business partners.

In 2011, Seinfeld married singer and former pornographic actress, Lupe Fuentes. They later divorced in 2020.

Seinfeld's second cousin, Jerry, is a stand-up comedian and actor.

References

External links

 
 
 

1965 births
Living people
American male pornographic film actors
Musicians from Brooklyn
Participants in American reality television series
American heavy metal bass guitarists
American heavy metal singers
Guitarists from New York (state)
American male bass guitarists
20th-century American bass guitarists
20th-century American male musicians
Nailbomb members
Damnocracy members
Biohazard (band) members